Polyalthia elmeri is a species of plant in the Annonaceae family. It is endemic to the Philippines.

References

Flora of the Philippines
elmeri
Vulnerable plants
Taxonomy articles created by Polbot